Jennifer Phang is an American filmmaker (writer, director, producer), most known for her feature films Advantageous (2015) and Half-Life (2008). Advantageous premiered at the 2015 Sundance Film Festival, winning a Special Jury Award for Collaborative Vision, and was based on her award-winning short film of the same name. Half-Life premiered at the 2008 Sundance Film Festival and won "Best Film" awards at a number of film festivals including the Gen Art Film Festival, the San Francisco International Asian American Film Festival (now known as CAAMFest) as well an "Emerging Director Award" at the Asian American International Film Festival.

Early life
Phang (pronounced "Pong") grew up in the Bay Area and is currently based in San Francisco. She was born in Berkeley, California and is of mixed Chinese Malaysian and Vietnamese heritage. She graduated from Pomona College with a Bachelor of Arts in Media Studies, and also graduated from the American Film Institute with a Masters of Fine Arts (M.F.A.) in Film Directing. She has also participated in the San Francisco Film Society Women Filmmaker Fellowship.

In 2008, Phang was named as one of the "25 new Faces of Independent Film" by Filmmaker Magazine. In 2015, she was selected as one of six Women at Sundance Fellows. In 2016 she was also selected for the Warner Bros. Television Directors' Workshop where she met the director/producer of Breaking Bad and Game of Thrones, Michelle MacLaren, who became her mentor.

Career

Feature films
Phang's debut feature film that she directed and wrote was entitled Half-Life (2008) and it starred Sanoe Lake, Julia Nickson-Soul, Leonardo Nam, James Eckhouse, Susan Ruttan and Alexander Agate. The film premiered at the 2008 Sundance Film Festival in the New Frontiers section, and also screened at the Gen Art Film Festival (where it won a Best Feature award), the San Francisco International Asian American Film Festival (where it won a Best Narrative award), the Asian American International Film Festival (where Phang won the "Emerging Director Award"), the Fairy Tales International Gay & Lesbian Film Festival (where it won the Visionary Award), the Tokyo International Film Festival (where it was in-competition and was nominated for the Tokyo Grand Prix), the Mannheim-Heidelberg International Film Festival (where it was also in competition and nominated for the Main Award), and the International Women's Film Festival in Seoul, Korea (where it was opening night film). The film received a limited theatrical release on December 1, 2009.

After Half life, Phang's follow-up project was, Look For Water, and Crazy Beats Strong Every Time. Phang received a grant from the Sundance Institute Cinereach Grant, the Sundance Annenberg Feature Film Fellowship, and the Tribeca Film Festival to support these developments.

Phang's follow up film that she directed, wrote and edited was Advantageous (2015), which was based on her award-winning short film of the same name. The film starred Jacqueline Kim, Ken Jeong, James Urbaniak, Freya Adams and Samantha Kim. The film also premiered in competition at the 2015 Sundance Film Festival (nominated for the Grand Jury Prize for U.S. Dramatic films), where it won the Grand Jury Prize for Collaborative Vision given to both Phang and star Jacqueline Kim with the inscription: "We are honoring two individuals for their unique collaborative vision. Two women that between them wrote, starred and co-edited a beautiful parable about a mother's love, sacrifice and society's worship of youth." At the 2015 Los Angeles Asian Pacific Film Festival, the film won, under the Narrative Feature category, Best Director (Jennifer Phang), Best Editor (Jennifer Phang and Sean Gillane), Best Musical Score (Timo Chen), and star Jacqueline Kim also won the Linda Mabalot Renaissance Spirit Award for her performance. Advantageous was released to Netflix June 2015.

Short films
Phang directed, wrote and edited a short film entitled Advantageous (2012) - the basis of the 2015 feature film of the same name - which imagined various scenarios and stories that took place in the future. The film won a Best Science Fiction Film award at the Rhode Island International Horror Film Festival and also the Golden Reel Award for Best Short Film at the 2012 Los Angeles Film Festival. It was also nominated for "Best Short Film" at Fantastic Fest, the Cleveland International Film Festival, the Philadelphia Asian American Film Festival, the Philadelphia Film Festival, the Asian American International Film Festival, the San Diego Asian Film Festival, the San Diego Comic-Con International Independent Film Festival, and the Urbanworld Film Festival.

Other short films that Phang directed include Midnight Boycow (2007) starring Rex Lee and Love, Ltd. (2000), which Phang also co-wrote with Jeff Kirschenbaum.

Television
Phang has guest-directed on episodic series television, including for The Boys, Cloak & Dagger, Quantico, The Expanse, Riverdale, Major Crimes, The Exorcist, Proven Innocent, Stargirl and Resident Alien. She remarks that it is interesting to work in an established universe with characters already defined, and to direct a wide variety of actors who are already familiar with their characters. In her opinion, TV directing work, in addition to the extra income, improves her versatility and adaptability in her film projects.

Music videos and other media projects
Phang also directed and wrote a piece entitled Glass Butterfly, a narrative music video featuring intensive visual effects, currently being completed via San Francisco's Studio 400A.

Screenwriting
For her screenplay Look for Water, which she co-wrote with Dominic Mah, she was invited to the Sundance Screenwriters' Lab in June 2008. The screenplay has also received the Tribeca Film Festival L'Oreal Woman of Worth Vision Award, a Sundance CineReach grant, and a Sundance Institute Annenberg Feature Film Fellowship Grant.

Editing and producing
Phang has also edited and produced the feature film Target Audience 9.1 (2007), written and directed by Dominic Mah, produced the short film Sitter (2004) also written and directed by Dominic Mah, and served as executive producer for the short film Crazy Beats Strong Every Time (2011), directed and written by Moon Molson, and which was an official selection of the 2011 Sundance Film Festival. Phang also shares an editing credit on her 2015 feature Advantageous. Phang works closely with Premiere Pro and uses After Effects when dealing with VFX.

Filmography
Short films

Feature films

Television

Awards
2015 Sundance Film Festival
Winner, Special Jury Award for Dramatic Feature: Advantageous 
Nominee, Grand Jury Prize for Dramatic Feature: Advantageous 
LA Asian Pacific Film Fest
Winner, Editing, score, and directing awards for Advantageous (feature) - 2015
Winner, Golden Reel Award for Excellence in Short Film: Advantageous - 2013
2012 Rhode Island Horror Film Festival
Winner, Best Science Fiction Film: Advantageous (Short) 
 Asian American International Film Festival
Winner, Best Narrative: Half Life - 2008
Winner, Emerging Director Award for Best Feature: Half Life - 2008
Nominee, Excellence in Short Filmmaking Award: Futurestate - 2013
Austin Fantastic Fest
Nominee, Short Film Award: Advantageous (short) - 2012
Cleveland International Film Festival
Nominee, Best Women's Short Film: Advantageous (short) - 2013
Nominee, Best Live Action Short Film: Advantageous (short) - 2013
Film Independent Spirit Awards
Nominee, John Cassavetes Award: (2016) Shared with Jacqueline Kim, Robert M. Chang, Ken Jeong, Moon Molson, Theresa Navarro
Gen Art Film Festival
Winner, Best Feature: Half-Life - 2008
Mannheim-Heidelberg International Film Festival
Nominee, Main Award of Mannheim-Heidelberg: Half-Life - 2008
Philadelphia Asian American Film Festival
Nominee, Festival Prize: Advantageous (short) - 2012
Philadelphia Film Festival
Nominee, Jury Award for Best Short: Advantageous (short) - 2012
San Diego Asian Film Festival
Nominee, Jury Award for Best Narrative Short: Advantageous (short) - 2012
San Diego Comic-Con International Independent Film Festival
Nominee, CCI:IFF Award for Best Science Fiction/Fantasy Film: Advantageous (short) - 2012
Tokyo International Film Festival
Nominee, Tokyo Grand Prix: Half-Life - 2008
Urbanworld Film Festival
Nominee, Jury Prize for Best Short: Advantageous - 2012

References

External links

Artists from Berkeley, California
Living people
Pomona College alumni
AFI Conservatory alumni
American people of Malaysian descent
American film directors of Vietnamese descent
Year of birth missing (living people)
Film directors from San Francisco
American women film directors